Adriana Cristina Serquis (born 7 November 1967) is an Argentine physicist, the president of the National Atomic Energy Commission (CNEA), and principal researcher of the National Scientific and Technical Research Council (CONICET). In 2014, she received the L'Oréal-UNESCO National Award For Women in Science for her contribution to the rational use of electrical energy.

Biography
Adriana Cristina Serquis was born in Buenos Aires on 7 November 1967. She took an interest in physics at an early age.

She earned a licentiate in physical sciences at the Faculty of Exact and Natural Sciences of the University of Buenos Aires in 1993, and a doctorate in physical sciences at the Balseiro Institute in 2000.

From 1994 to 2000, she was a fellow of the CNEA and CONICET. From 2001 to 2003, she was a post-doctoral researcher at Los Alamos National Laboratory in the United States.

As CONICET's principal researcher at the CNEA's Bariloche Atomic Center, her line of research was framed in developing advanced techniques for characterizing materials for clean energies, where she studied the synthesis and characterization of superconducting materials and nanometric oxides for high temperature fuel cells.

She also served as an adjunct professor at the Andean Headquarters of the National University of Río Negro, dictating materials for the chemistry program, and as a visiting professor at the Balseiro Institute.

She was named president of the CNEA on 4 June 2021.

Awards
 2006: Bernardo Houssay Young Researcher Award
 2013: Merit Diploma in Nanotechnology from the Konex Foundation
 2014: L'Oréal-UNESCO National Award For Women in Science

Selected publications
 "Effect of lattice strain and defects on the superconductivity of MgB2", A Serquis, YT Zhu, EJ Peterson, JY Coulter, DE Peterson, FM Mueller, Applied Physics Letters 79 (2001), 4399–4401.
 "Strongly enhanced current densities in superconducting coated conductors of YBa2Cu3O7–δ+ BaZrO3", JL MacManus-Driscoll, SR Foltyn, QX Jia, H Wang, A Serquis, L Civale, Nature Materials 3 (2004), 439–443.
 "High performance nanostructured IT-SOFC cathodes prepared by novel chemical method", L. Baqué, A. Caneiro, M. S. Moreno, A. Serquis, Electroch. Comm. 10 (2008) 1905.
 "Vertically aligned nanocomposite thin films as a cathode-electrolyte interface layer for thin film solid oxide fuel cells", S.M. Cho, J.S. Yoon, J.H. Kim, Z.X. Bi, A. Serquis, X.H. Zhang, A. Manthiram, and H.Y. Wang, Advanced Functional Materials 19 (2009) 3868–3873.
 "Synthesis and structural characterization of Co-doped lanthanum strontium titanates", F. Napolitano, D. G. Lamas, A. Soldati, A. Serquis, IJHE 37 (2012) 18302–18309.

References

External links
 Adriana Serquis at the Bariloche Atomic Center

1967 births
21st-century Argentine physicists
Argentine nuclear physicists
Argentine women physicists
Living people
Los Alamos National Laboratory personnel
Academic staff of the National University of Río Negro
Nanotechnologists
People from Buenos Aires
University of Buenos Aires alumni